Two ships of the United States Navy have been named USS Georgia in honor of the fourth state.

 , the fourth , no longer serves as a ballistic missile submarine (SSBN), but has been converted into a guided missile submarine (SSGN).
 , an American Civil War gunboat steamer of the Union Navy

See also
 
 Georgia (disambiguation)

United States Navy ship names